The Gyle Shopping Centre is located in the South Gyle area of Edinburgh, Scotland. The main centre has two anchor tenants, Marks & Spencer and Morrisons (formerly Safeway), at opposite ends of the shopping centre.

Construction 

A new district shopping centre for West Edinburgh was proposed by a public inquiry in 1987. The findings of the West Edinburgh Inquiry of 1989 were approved by the then Secretary of State for Scotland. The floor space in the shopping centre, which was originally called Maybury Park, was later scaled down to 9,290 m2 (100,000 sq ft) to protect nearby retail areas, such as Wester Hailes and Corstorphine.

The management contractor, Wimpey Construction, began work on The Gyle in April 1992, and it opened in October 1993. A food court was later added in the beginning of 1994, by the Catering Development.

Expansion 
The food court was added shortly after opening. Marks & Spencer have since added more shop space of their own, and took the opportunity to change their floor layout - adding a larger food hall - during the COVID-19 pandemic in 2021.

The centre applied for planning permission to expand the food hall and add a cinema in 2019. The plans would have moved the bus stance away from the front of the centre, and were ultimately rejected by the City of Edinburgh Council's planning committee due to potential issues with public transport and cycling that the changes could cause.

Ownership of the centre then changed and the new owners started looking at grand plans to change the nature of the shopping centre to closer resemble a local town centre rather than an out of town shopping centre.

Ownership 
Gyle Shopping Centre opened in October 1993. The centre began as a joint development between Edinburgh Council, Marks and Spencer and Asda, although by the time of opening, Asda was replaced by Safeway. In 1997, Gyle was purchased outright by Marks and Spencer, who then sold the centre to USS in March 2000.

Ownership of the centre changed again in late 2020 or early 2021. A failed planning application to expand the food court and add a cinema to the centre has hit the complex hard, along with the pandemic.

Current stores 
The Gyle has many stores, including WHSmith, Next, Virgin Media, Boots, Bank of Scotland, Marks & Spencer, Pandora, JD Sports, Holland & Barrett, Schuh and River Island. The food court was refurbished in 2005, and currently contains two outlets.

Transport 
The Gyle Centre is served by its own dedicated tram stop. The Gyle Centre is also served by Lothian Buses services 2, 12, 21, 22, 36 & Skylink 400 and McGill's Scotland East services 20, 63 & 68, and is close to the A720 Edinburgh City Bypass road. It is also linked under an underpass to Edinburgh Gateway station.

References

External links
 Official site

Tourist attractions in Edinburgh
Shopping malls established in 1993
Shopping centres in Edinburgh
1993 establishments in Scotland
Edinburgh Trams stops